Robert Michell (died 1563), of Norwich, Norfolk, was an English politician.

He was a Member of Parliament (MP) for Norwich in 1563 and mayor of the city in 1560–61.

References

Year of birth missing
1563 deaths
Politicians from Norwich
Mayors of Norwich
English MPs 1563–1567